General is a four-star general officer rank in the Indian Army. It is the highest active rank in the Indian Army. General ranks above the three-star rank of lieutenant general and below the five-star rank of field marshal, which is largely a war-time or ceremonial rank.

A general may be referred to as a full general or four-star general to distinguish them from lower general officer ranks like lieutenant general and major general. The equivalent rank in the Indian Navy is admiral and in the Indian Air Force is air chief marshal.

As of 2022, there are two serving full generals in the Indian Armed Forces, General Anil Chauhan, the Chief of Defence Staff and Chairman, Chiefs of Staff Committee, and General Manoj Pandey, the Chief of the Army Staff.

History
The first Indian to hold the rank of full general was K. M. Cariappa. He was promoted to the acting rank of General when he took over as the Commander-in-Chief of the Indian Army on 15 January 1949. All the chiefs of the Indian Army after him, have been full generals. 

Since 1950, it has been a tradition for the President of India to award the chief of the Nepalese Army with the honorary rank of General of the Indian Army. 

The rank is held by the Chief of the Army Staff (COAS), the professional head of the Indian Army, and may also be held by the Chief of Defence Staff (CDS). Until 1 January 2020, when the post of Chief of the Defence Staff (CDS) was established, the COAS was the only officer to hold the rank of full general. Upon the creation of the post and the appointment of General Bipin Rawat as the first CDS, there were two serving full generals for the first time in Independent India.

Insignia
The rank insignia of a general are:
 CDS - Gold-wreathed tri-service emblem of the Indian Armed Forces (the Naval anchor, crossed Army swords and Air Force eagle, all surmounted by the Ashoka emblem).
 COAS - Crossed sword and baton with a five-pointed star and Ashoka emblem above.

The gorget patches of a general are: 
 CDS - maroon patches with four golden stars and golden laurel wreath
 COAS - crimson patches with four golden stars and golden laurel wreath

Appointment and term length
Appointments to the office of CDS and COAS are made by the Appointments Committee of the Cabinet (ACC), which is chaired by the Prime Minister of India. The term length of the Chief of Defence Staff is three years or until the age of 65 of the holder, whichever is earlier. The Chief of the Army Staff reaches superannuation upon three years in the office or at the age of 62, whichever is earlier.

Order of precedence
A general ranks at No. 12 on the Indian order of precedence, along with the CDS and the Chiefs of Staff of the Indian Navy and Indian Air Force (the CNS and the CAS). A general is at pay level 18, equivalent to Cabinet Secretary of India (at No. 11 on the warrant of precedence), with a monthly pay of ₹250,000 (US$3,500).

See also
 Chief of Defence Staff
 Chief of the Army Staff
 List of serving generals of the Indian Army
 Army ranks and insignia of India

References

India Army
Military ranks of the Indian Army
Four-star officers